Droid (sometimes typeset as -D-R-O-I-D- or DROID as to fit their official logo) was an American groove metal band from Long Beach, California, formerly signed to Korn member James "Munky" Shaffer's record label Emotional Syphon Records.

History 
Droid was signed to Emotional Syphon Records after Korn guitarist James "Munky" Shaffer saw them perform at the world-renowned Whisky a Go Go in Los Angeles. The band accompanied Korn and Limp Bizkit on their 2003 Back 2 Basics Tour, as well as the 2006 and 2007 installments of the Family Values Tour.

Droid also served as backing musicians for Korn bassist Fieldy's side project Fieldy's Dreams.

The band was voted 2007 newcomer of the year at The Gauntlet, and the music video for "Fueled by Hate" was voted the No. 11 video of 2007 on MTV2's Headbangers Ball.

Droid released a free new song "Condemn the Weak" in 2009 on Droidmusic.com in anticipation of following-up their self-titled 2007 album, but it never materialized. The band is currently defunct.

Former bassist Wilfred "Duke" Collins died on March 22, 2015.

Discography

Members

Final lineup 
 James Eason – vocals (1997–2010)
 Jamie Teissere – guitar (1997–2010)
 Bruce Childress – guitar (1997–2010)
 Nick McWells – drums (2005–2010)
 Ryan Burchfield – bass (2007–2010)

Former members 
 Steve Marcucci – drums (1996–2001)
 Alan Mendoza – bass (1996–2000)
 Filthy – vocals
 Dirt E – bass (2001, 2004–2005)
 Jason Garrison – drums (2001)
 Bryan – bass (2002–2004)
 Wilfred "Duke" Collins – bass (2005–2007)
 Fil Rebellato – drums (2002–2004)

References

External links 
Official MySpace

Interviews 
 James "Buddy" Eason Interview on Minnage
 James "Buddy" Eason Interview on Type 3 Media

Heavy metal musical groups from California
American groove metal musical groups
Musical groups from Los Angeles